The Birmingham Tattoo is held annually at the Utilita Arena, previously known as the Barclaycard Arena, and previously before that known as the National Indoor Arena in the centre of Birmingham, England. The military tattoo features massed military bands, and displays. The event takes place for two performances in November each year. The event has been held since 1989 and has attracted performers from the United States, Europe and Russia as well as British bands from the Royal Marines, Coldstream Guards, King's Division and Gurkhas. The Birmingham Tattoo features traditional military music, field gun racing, dancers, dog display teams and one of the largest gatherings of standard bearers with around 120 standards on parade at each performance. Each year the event raises money at each performance for the Royal Star and Garter Homes who provide care homes for disabled ex-Service men and women. Over £93,000 has been donated to the charity since 2008.

External links 
 Birmingham Tattoo website
 Birmingham Tattoo YouTube videos
 Military Music Spectaculars

Festivals in Birmingham, West Midlands
Military tattoos
Annual events in the United Kingdom